Area code 870 is a telephone area code in the North American Numbering Plan (NANP) for southern, eastern, and most of northern Arkansas. It was created on April 14, 1997 in a split from area code 501, Arkansas's original area code of 1947.

Area code 870 designates one of three numbering plan areas (NPAs) in Arkansas, 479, 501,and 870. It was the first to be split from 501, and comprises most of the state outside Little Rock, Fort Smith, and Fayetteville/Springdale/Rogers. Major cities in the area include Jonesboro, Mountain Home, Pine Bluff, Texarkana, El Dorado, and West Memphis.

In 2009, the Arkansas Public Service Commission projected that the supply of unassigned telephone numbers for 870 would run out in 2013, prompting a December 2009 approval of an all-service overlay plan for this portion of the state. Area code 327 was assigned for this purpose in January 2010. The release of little-used central office codes and the nationwide introduction of number pooling delayed the exhaustion of the numbering pool and the overlay was indefinitely suspended in June 2012. Area code 870 is projected to exhaust in March 2025, so area code 327 will be activated on February 20, 2024. Ten-digit dialing is scheduled to begin on January 19, 2024.

References

External links

List of exchanges from AreaCodeDownload.com, 870 Area Code

870
870